Negroni is an Italian/Corsican surname. Notable people with the surname include:

 Andrea Negroni (1710–1789), Italian Cardinal
 Baldassarre Negroni (1877–1948), Italian film director and screenwriter
 Christine Negroni (born 1956), American aviation and travel writer 
 Daniele Negroni (1995), Italian singer and runner-up on Deutschland sucht den Superstar (season 9)
 Giovanni Francesco Negroni (1629–1713), Italian Cardinal
 Héctor Andrés Negroni (born 1938), American Air Force officer, historian and aerospace senior executive
 Jean Négroni  (1920–2005) French actor
 Joe Negroni (1940–1978), American singer of Puerto Rican descent
 Luca Negroni (born 1964), Italian ski mountaineer
 María Negroni (born 1951), Argentinian poet, essayist, novelist and translator
 General Pascal Olivier Count de Negroni (1829–1913), led the charge of Cuirassiers in the Battle of Reichshoffen during the Franco-Prussian War of 1870
 Pietro Negroni (c.1505–1565), Italian painter of the Renaissance period

Other
 Negroni, cocktail invented by Pascal Olivier Count de Negroni

See also
 Neroni, also an Italian surname

Italian-language surnames